Aisin Gioro Hongsheng (恭恪貝勒 弘昇; 6 April 1696 – 22 April 1754) was Qing dynasty imperial prince as the first son of Yunki, Prince Hengwen of the First Rank.

Life 
Hongsheng was born on 6 April 1696 to lady Liugiya, Secondary Princess Consort Hengwen of the First Rank.

In 1719, Hongsheng was designated an hereditary prince Heng of the First Rank (世子). Since 1721, Hongsheng guarded the imperial tombs Xiaoling, Zhaoling together with Hongzhi, Yunlu and Yunli.  Hongsheng received an appointment in the imperial stables and supervised the affairs of the Bordered White Banner. In 1727, Hongsheng was stripped of his title because of negligence in meddling the official affairs and mistrust. Hongsheng's father was instructed to impose a strict treatment on him and dedicate time for his study. In 1735, Hongsheng was appointed as a commander of Artillery.

In 1739, Hongsheng and 6 other princes generation were embroiled in unsuccessful coup d'état initiated by Hongxi, the eldest son of the deposed crown prince Yinreng. The princes met at the Prince Zhuang Manor to discuss the plan to overthrow the Qianlong Emperor and transfer the throne to Hongxi. During the Mulan hunt, Hongsheng was the first prince to declare Hongxi an emperor. After the plan of fractionists was exposed by Hongpu, Hongsheng did not plead his innocence. He was perpetually imprisoned because of having been stripped of the title.

Hongsheng died in 1754 and was posthumously honoured as Prince Gongke of the Third Rank (恭恪贝勒, meaning "reverent and respectful").

Family

Consorts and issue 

 Primary consort of the Daigiya clan (嫡夫人戴佳氏) 
 Second primary consort, of the Tatara clan (继夫人他他拉氏)
 Mistress, of the Ilari clan (妾伊拉里氏)
 Second son
 Mistress, of the Joogiya clan (妾兆佳氏)
 Yongrui (永瑞; 1716–1789), first son
 Mistress, of the Yang clan (妾杨氏)
 Prince of the Fourth Rank Yongze (贝子永泽;1741-1810)

Family tree

References 

Qing dynasty imperial princes
Prince Heng